Massimiliano "Massi" Furlan (born 29 September 1968) is an Italian-American actor and film producer who began his entertainment career as a stand-up comedian. He is known for appearing in several television series and in the films The Dark Knight Rises (2012), Live by Night (2016), Jumanji: The Next Level (2019) and Bad Boys for Life (2020).

Early life

Born Massimiliano Furlan in Treviso, Italy to Nereo and Giancarla Furlan, Massi is the eldest of their two sons. While growing up Massi loved to play soccer, a sport at which he excelled. He attended the Liceo artistico art school, specializing in painting.

When Massi was seventeen, he voluntarily joined the Italian Army and served for six years as a specialist in a helicopter crew.

Acting career
In 2007 Massi moved to Hollywood, California where he quickly landed roles in the HBO pilot 1%, Days of Our Lives, and Terminator: The Sarah Connor Chronicles. These were soon followed by appearances on General Hospital, Criminal Minds, One Tree Hill, and Aim High.

Massi then appeared in a number of feature films, including The Dark Knight Rises, True Blood, Keeping Up with the Joneses, Trafficked and Live By Night.

Recently, Massi portrayed a designer of Gianni Versace on The Assassination of Gianni Versace: American Crime Story, and he guest starred as Luca Camilleri on Supernatural. He played the role of Switchblade in Jumanji: The Next Level, released in December 2019. Most recently, Massi appeared as the character Terry Taglin in Bad Boys for Life with Will Smith and Martin Lawrence.

Filmography
Some of Massi's more notable projects include:

References

External links
 

1968 births
Living people
American male film actors
American male television actors
American film producers
American people of Italian descent
People from Treviso
21st-century American male actors